Abdelkader Oueslati Kaabi (born 7 October 1991), commonly known as Kader, is a footballer who plays for Club Africain as a right-back or winger. Born in France, he represents Tunisia at international level.

Club career
Born in Décines-Charpieu, Rhône-Alpes, Kader joined Atlético Madrid's youth setup in 2009, aged 18. He made his senior debuts with the reserves, spending several seasons in Segunda División B.

Kader made his debut with the Colchoneros' first team on 19 August 2012, replacing Sívlio midway through the second half of a 1–1 La Liga draw against Levante UD.

On 14 August 2014, Kader joined Segunda División's CD Numancia in a season-long loan. On 1 August of the following year he moved to Club Africain, after agreeing to a three-year deal.

International career
Kader was first called up for the Tunisia national team on 2 October 2012 in a 2013 ACN qualification game against Sierra Leone on 13 October 2012 in Monastir, Tunisia.

References

External links

1991 births
Living people
People from Décines-Charpieu
Sportspeople from Lyon Metropolis
French footballers
Tunisian footballers
Footballers from Auvergne-Rhône-Alpes
Association football defenders
Tunisia international footballers
Tunisia A' international footballers
2016 African Nations Championship players
La Liga players
Segunda División players
Segunda División B players
Saudi Professional League players
Atlético Madrid footballers
Atlético Madrid B players
CD Numancia players
Club Africain players
Al-Fateh SC players
French expatriate footballers
Tunisian expatriate footballers
Expatriate footballers in Saudi Arabia
Tunisian expatriate sportspeople in Saudi Arabia
French expatriate sportspeople in Spain
Tunisian expatriate sportspeople in Spain
Expatriate footballers in Spain